Cinnamodendron tenuifolium is a species of flowering plant in the family Canellaceae. It is found in Suriname.

References 
	

tenuifolium